Christopher Caudwell was the pseudonym of Christopher St John Sprigg (20 October 1907 – 13 February 1937), a British Marxist writer, literary critic, intellectual and activist.

Life
He was born into a Roman Catholic family in London, England. He was educated at the Benedictine Ealing Priory School, but left school at the age of 15 and worked first as a cub reporter at the Yorkshire Observer, where his father was literary editor, and then as editor of British Malaya.

Two years later his founded an aeronautical publishing company with his brother. He also published on automobiles and he designed a infinitely variable gear. He continued scientific studies and published The Crisis of Physics in 1936.

According to Marxist historian Helena Sheehan, Caudwell became interested in Marxism in 1934 and began to study it with "extraordinary intensity". In the summer of 1935, he wrote his first Marxist book entitled Illusions and Reality: A Study of the Sources of Poetry which was published by Macmillan. Following the completion of his book he joined the Communist Party of Great Britain.

Death and legacy
According to the socialist magazine Monthly Review, Caudwell on 12 February 1937 "was killed by fascists in the valley of Jarama during the Spanish Civil War. He died at a machine gun post, guarding the retreat of his comrades in the British Battalion of the International Brigade".

The Marxist historian E. P. Thompson wrote of Caudwell, "It is not difficult to see Caudwell as a phenomenon – as an extraordinary shooting-star crossing England’s empirical night – as a premonitory sign of a more sophisticated Marxism whose true annunciation was delayed until the Sixties". The Marxist academic John Bellamy Foster similarly credited Caudwell with "breathtaking intellectual achievements in a brief period of time".

In his 1942 introduction to The Fury of the Living, a collection of poems by John Singer, Hugh MacDiarmid called Caudwell (along with John Cornford, another young writer killed fighting in Spain), one of the "few inspiring exceptions" from the "leftist poets of the comfortable classes".

Works

Criticism
Illusion and Reality: A Study of the Sources of Poetry (1937)
Studies in a Dying Culture (1938)
The Crisis in Physics (1939)
Further Studies in a Dying Culture (1949)
Romance and Realism: A Study in English Bourgeois Literature (1970)
Scenes and Actions (1986)
Culture As Politics: Selected Writings of Christopher Caudwell (Pluto Press, 2017)

Poetry
Poems (1939)
Collected Poems (1986)

Short stories
Scenes and Actions (1986)
"Death at 8:30"
"The Case of the Jesting Miser" (unpublished)
"The Case of the Misjudged Husband"

Novels 
[as Christopher St. John Sprigg]
The Kingdom of Heaven (1929)
Crime in Kensington/Pass the Body (1933)
Fatality in Fleet Street (1933)
The Perfect Alibi (1934)
Death of an Airman (1934)
The Corpse with the Sunburnt Face (1935)
Death of a Queen (1935)
This My Hand (1936)
The Six Queer Things (1937)

Other
The Airship: Its Design, History, Operation and Future (1931)
British Airways (1934)

See also
 Maurice Cornforth
Morgan, W. John, 'Pacifism or Bourgeois Pacifism? Huxley, Orwell, and Caudwell'. Chapter 5 in Morgan, W. John and Guilherme, Alexandre (Eds.), Peace and War-Historical, Philosophical, and Anthropological Perspectives, Palgrave Macmillan, 2020, pp, 71-96. .

References

External links

 
Christopher Caudwell Archive at the Marxists Internet Archive
 The Concept of Freedom, collection of thirteen essays by Caudwell from three of his books.
Christopher Caudwell by Helena Sheehan: an extract from Marxism and the Philosophy of Science: A Critical History (Humanities Press: 1985, 1993).
A British Hero - Christopher St.John Sprigg aka Christopher Caudwell by Dr. James Whetter (Lyfrow Trelyspen: 2011).

1907 births
1937 deaths
20th-century English poets
20th-century male writers
British Marxists
British people of the Spanish Civil War
Communist Party of Great Britain members
British Communist poets
British Communist writers
English anti-fascists
English literary critics
Former Roman Catholics
International Brigades personnel
British Marxist journalists
Military personnel killed in the Spanish Civil War
People educated at St Benedict's School, Ealing
People from Putney